Patrick Henley (May 4, 1959 – September 3, 2021), known professionally as Henriette Valium, was a Canadian comic book artist and painter based in Montreal, Quebec.

Career
In March 2013, some of Valium's art pieces were shown at Espace Robert Poulin in Montreal.

Valium won the Pigskin Peters Award at the 2017 Doug Wright Awards for his Palace of Champions graphic novel (Conundrum, 2016).

References

External links
 Official website

1959 births
2021 deaths
Artists from Montreal
Alternative cartoonists
Canadian comics artists
Canadian comics writers
Quebec comics
Writers from Montreal